USS Palmer may refer to more than one United States Navy ship:

 , in commission as a destroyer from 1918 to 1922 and as a minesweeper (redesignated DMS-5) from 1940 to 1945
 , later USS SP-319, a patrol vessel and cable ship in commission from 1917 to 1919

Palmer